Étienne Trocmé (8 November 1924 – 12 August 2002) was a French historian of the birth of Christianity. A New Testament and Christianity of the 1st century scholar, Trocmé is the author of several works including Jésus de Nazareth (1972) and Enfance du christianisme (1997).

Biography 
After he was a student at the École Nationale des Chartes (1946) and the École pratique des hautes études, Etienne Trocmé studied literature and theology from 1947 to 1950, then in 1950 passed his State doctorate (1960) He also spent one year at the University of California, Los Angeles (1946-1947) and another one at the University of Basel (1950–1951), where he familiarized with the German language and followed lessons by Karl Barth.

Distinctions 
Honorary degree of the Glasgow University 
Honorary degree of the Tōyō University in Tokyo
His biographer Christian Wolff mentions he did not wear his decorations.

Publications 
Étienne Trocmé wrote more than 200 articles and books translated into several languages.

Memoirs 
Le Commerce rochelais de la fin du XVe au début du XVIIe, thèse, École des Chartes, 1952
 La formation de l'évangile selon Marc, thèse d'État, Paris 1963

Books 
 Jésus de Nazareth vu par les témoins de sa vie, Delachaux & Niestle, 1971.
 Le christianisme des origines au Concile de Nicée, 1972
 Le Christianisme des origines à 325 in Encyclopédie de la Pléiade, Histoire des religions, t. II, 1972
 The Passion as Liturgy : a Study in the origin of the Passion narratives in the four Gospels, 1983
 La Rochelle protestante (1568-1628) in Histoire de La Rochelle, Privat, 1985, (2e éd. 1991)
 L'enfance du christianisme, Hachette, coll. « Pluriel », 1999.
 L'évangile selon saint Marc, Labor et Fides, coll. « Commentaire du Nouveau Testament, deuxième série », 2000. 
 Quatre Évangiles, Une Seule Foi, Les Bergers Et Les Mages, coll. « Petite Bibliothèque Protestante », 2001.
 Saint Paul, coll. Que sais-je?, PUF, 2003 (posthumous)

References

Sources 
 Christian Wolff, Biographie d'Étienne Trocmé  in Bibliothèque de l'école des Chartes, année 2003, Volume 161, issue 161-2, (p. 769–772) Read online
 Christian Wolff, « Étienne Trocmé », in Nouveau dictionnaire de biographie alsacienne, vol. 37, (p. 3910)

See also
 Biblical criticism
 Historicity of Jesus
 Paul the Apostle

20th-century French historians
École Nationale des Chartes alumni
École pratique des hautes études alumni
French Protestant theologians
French biblical scholars
Commandeurs of the Légion d'honneur
Members of the Société Asiatique
Commanders of the Ordre national du Mérite
Commandeurs of the Ordre des Palmes Académiques
Officers of the Order of Merit of the Italian Republic
Scientists from Paris
1924 births
2002 deaths